The Colmore Building, formerly known as Colmore Plaza, is a 14-storey office building in the Colmore Business District area of Birmingham City Centre.

The building
The Colmore Building is a Grade A office building spread over 14 storeys. It can accommodate lettings of up to 104,000 sq ft across 23,000 sq ft floor plates and has a BREEAM environmental and sustainability rating of 'Excellent'.

Major tenants
AECOM
Aedas
Allianz
Amey plc
Grant Thornton International
Investec
Lendlease
Marsh & McLennan Companies
Zurich Insurance Group
Irwin Mitchell Solicitors

Location
The Colmore Building is located in the Colmore Business District, which is Birmingham's main business area. There are around 500 companies located in the Colmore Business District, employing up to 35,000 people and occupying approximately 5.6m sq ft of office space.

Ownership
Colmore Plaza was purchased from The Carlyle Group by real estate investment advisory company, AshbyCapital LLP, for £140m in August 2015, in what was one of the largest single-asset regional deals of 2015. AshbyCapital secured an £80m loan with AgFe to fund the deal. AshbyCapital's other investments include 200 Aldersgate, a 434,005 sq ft office building in the City of London and The Avenue, an office and retail building on the corner of Bedford Avenue and Tottenham Court Road in London’s West End.

Enhancement programme
In January 2016, AshbyCapital announced a £3.5m enhancement programme and relaunched the building under the new name, The Colmore Building. As part of this programme, a coffee house, gym, treatment rooms and cycling facilities, including bicycle parking, changing rooms and a drying room were announced, along with an enlarged and refurbished reception area.

References

External links
The Colmore Building website
AshbyCapital website
Colmore Business District website

Buildings and structures in Birmingham, West Midlands